Nigrotipula is a genus of true crane fly.

Distribution
Palaearctic & India.

Species
N. achlypoda (Alexander, 1966)
N. bathroxantha (Alexander, 1961)
N. nigra (Linnaeus, 1758)
N. xanthocera (Alexander, 1936)
N. zhejiangensis Yang & Yang, 1995

References

Tipulidae
Diptera of Europe
Diptera of Asia